Janaki Venkataraman (1921 – 13 August 2010) was the First Lady of India from 1987 until 1992. She was the wife of Indian President R. Venkataraman who served as India's head of state from 25 July 1987 until 25 July 1992.

Early life 
Janaki was born in Pegu, Burma, to Tamil Iyer Burmese Indian parents, Kamala and Krishna Iyer. Her mother died with she was five and as her father did not remarry, she assisted with the household duties along with her siblings. Janaki was married to R. Venkataraman in 1938 and had three daughters. She was considered "deeply pious" in her Hinduism by Gopal Gandhi. After her marriage, her husband's political and unionist activities increased. To assist him, she became a partner in the Labor Law Journal which he had established.

Human Rights Activist 
Janaki was a human rights activist and led "hundreds of supporters" in protests about the war violence perpetrated upon women during the Bangladeshi War. She was an ardent feminist and supported women's self-reliance, as well as a humanitarian, working on projects for the poor. In addition, she was an animal rights activist refusing to wear silk which required worms to be killed and instead popularized the wearing of Ahimsa silk, which does not require harming the cocoon. Her promotion of wearing saris created without harming the silkworms led to popularity of Ahimsa Silk (also called "mulberry silk") and inspired entrepreneurs to develop the technology further. In addition to obtaining a patent, the Andhra Pradesh State Handloom Weavers Co-operative Society began marketing its "vegan wild silk" products to high end fashion labels.

When a documentary about her husband's life was made and Janaki was included in only one frame, she requested removal of the image. She preferred to be "noticed in the absence than to be ignored as an insignificant presence." She accompanied her husband on state visits and was the public face of "Indian womanhood" during his presidency. As an active first lady, she was responsible for implementing social welfare programs that came from the president's office.

Janaki Venkataraman died on 13 August 2010, a year and a half after her husband died. She is survived by her three daughters.

See also
List of spouses of vice presidents of India

References

1921 births
2010 deaths
Burmese people of Indian descent
First ladies and gentlemen of India
Second ladies and gentlemen of India
Women in Tamil Nadu politics
Indian human rights activists
Indian women's rights activists
People from Bago Region
Indian women activists
Burmese women activists
Burmese activists
Indian women philanthropists
20th-century Indian philanthropists
Indian expatriates in Myanmar
20th-century women philanthropists